Paweł Salacz (born 7 July 1997) is a Polish handball player for Wybrzeże Gdańsk and the Polish national team.

References

1997 births
Living people
People from Brzeg
Sportspeople from Silesian Voivodeship
Polish male handball players